Richmond—West Cape Breton was a federal electoral district in the province of Nova Scotia, Canada, that was represented in the House of Commons of Canada from 1925 to 1935.

This riding was created in 1924 from Cape Breton South and Richmond riding. It consisted of the County of Richmond and the part of the County of Cape Breton lying east of East Bay and south of the electoral district of Cape Breton South. It was abolished in 1933 when it was merged into Inverness—Richmond riding.

Members of Parliament

This riding elected the following Members of Parliament:

Election results

By-election: On Mr. Macdonald's acceptance of an office of emolument under the Crown, 22 August 1930

See also 

 List of Canadian federal electoral districts
 Past Canadian electoral districts

External links 
 Riding history for Richmond—West Cape Breton (1924–1933) from the Library of Parliament

Former federal electoral districts of Nova Scotia